Polšina ( or ) is a small settlement southeast of Trojane in central Slovenia. It belongs to the Municipality of Zagorje ob Savi. The area is part of the traditional region of Upper Carniola. It is now included with the rest of the municipality in the Central Sava Statistical Region.

References

External links

Polšina on Geopedia

Populated places in the Municipality of Zagorje ob Savi